Jonás Cuarón Elizondo (born 1981) is a Mexican film director, screenwriter, producer, editor and cinematographer. He is the son of the Academy Award-winner Alfonso Cuarón by the latter's first wife, Mariana Elizondo. Jonás Cuarón
studied film at Vassar College.

His first feature film, Año uña which he directed, wrote and produced, was released in 2007. It is known in English as Year of the Nail. He co-wrote the highly acclaimed 2013 film Gravity. The film was co-written and directed by his father.

His uncle, Carlos Cuarón, is also a writer and director and his half-brother, Diego Cataño, is an actor. His first film credit is a cameo as a child in the 1991 film Sólo con tu pareja, which was directed by his father.

Filmography

Short films

Television

Acting credits

References

External links
 

1981 births
Hugo Award-winning writers
Living people
Nebula Award winners
Mexican film directors
Mexican film producers
Mexican screenwriters
Place of birth missing (living people)
Spanish-language film directors
Vassar College alumni